Lizo Makhosi (born 19 February 1999) is a South African cricketer. He made his first-class debut for Border in the 2018–19 CSA 3-Day Provincial Cup on 11 October 2018. He made his List A debut for Border in the 2018–19 CSA Provincial One-Day Challenge on 13 January 2019. He made his Twenty20 debut on 20 February 2021, for Warriors in the 2020–21 CSA T20 Challenge.

References

External links
 

1999 births
Living people
South African cricketers
Border cricketers
Eastern Province cricketers
Warriors cricketers
Place of birth missing (living people)